Biturix is a genus of moths in the subfamily Arctiinae.

Species
Biturix diversipes Walker, 1855
Biturix grisea Dognin, 1899
Biturix hoffmannsi Rothschild, 1909
Biturix intactus (Walker, 1855)
Biturix lanceolata (Walker, 1856)
Biturix pellucida (Sepp, [1852])
Biturix pervenosa Forbes, 1939
Biturix rectilinea (Burmeister, 1878)
Biturix venosata (Walker, [1865])

Former species
Biturix mathani Rothschild, 1909

References

External links
Natural History Museum Lepidoptera generic names catalog

Phaegopterina
Moth genera